Nuno Pombo (born 20 April 1978) is a Portuguese athlete who competes in archery.

2008 Summer Olympics
At the 2008 Summer Olympics in Beijing Pombo finished his ranking round with a total of 650 points, which gave him the 42nd seed for the final competition bracket in which he faced Yusuf Ergin in the first round. With 106-103 Ergin was the winner of the confrontation and Pombo was eliminated. Ergin would lose in the following round against Lee Chang-Hwan.

References

1978 births
Living people
Portuguese male archers
Archers at the 1996 Summer Olympics
Archers at the 2000 Summer Olympics
Archers at the 2008 Summer Olympics
Olympic archers of Portugal
S.L. Benfica (archery)